Pedro "Piti" Belmonte Rincón (born 13 September 1973) is a Spanish retired professional footballer who played as a midfielder, and a current coach.

Playing career
Born in Barcelona, Catalonia, Piti finished his graduation with CE Sabadell FC, making his professional debut on 6 September 1992, playing the last three minutes of a 0–3 away loss against UE Figueres in the Segunda División. His first goal came on 13 June of the following year, but in a 3–4 home loss against Racing de Santander. However, the Arquelinats dropped two divisions, due to financial problems.

In 1994 Piti joined Valencia CF Mestalla, and a season later he signed with CP Almería. He returned to Sabadell in 1996, and two seasons later joined UE Figueres. He resumed the most of 1his career playing for teams in his native region, and eventually hang up his boots in February 2010, aged 36, with UDA Gramenet.

Manager career
After hanging up his boots Villa was a manager of UDA Gramenet, and had to deal with the club's financial problems during the 2009–10 season. In November 2010, he signed with lowly CP San Cristóbal.

In June 2011, Piti was appointed manager of UE Sant Andreu. He finished his both seasons with two mid-table finishes (10th and 7th, respectively), and was relieved from his duties in May 2013.

On 10 June 2013, Piti was appointed CF Badalona's manager.

References

External links
 
 
 Futbolme profile  

1973 births
Living people
Footballers from Barcelona
Spanish footballers
Association football midfielders
Segunda División players
Segunda División B players
Tercera División players
CE Sabadell FC footballers
Valencia CF Mestalla footballers
UE Figueres footballers
Hércules CF players
UE Lleida players
Algeciras CF footballers
Terrassa FC footballers
Real Jaén footballers
CF Badalona players
CF Gavà players
UDA Gramenet footballers
Spanish football managers
UE Sant Andreu managers
CF Badalona managers
CE Sabadell FC B players